Acanthus (plural: acanthus, rarely acanthuses in English, or acanthi in Latin), its feminine form acantha (plural: acanthae), the Latinised form of the ancient Greek word acanthos or akanthos, or the prefix acantho-, may refer to:

Biology 
Acanthus (plant), a genus containing plants used for ornament and in  traditional medicine
Acanthus, an entomological term for a thorn-like projection on an insect, typically a single-celled cuticular growth without tormogen (socket) or sensory cells

Mythology
Acantha, a figure in Greek mythology associated with the Acanthus plant
Acanthus, son of Autonous who received his name after the plant, which was common in his infertile homeland

People
Acanthus of Sparta, an ancient athlete
Acanthus, the pen-name of the cartoonist Frank Hoar

Places
Acanthus, Ontario, a modern Canadian town
Acanthus (Caria), a town of ancient Caria, near Bybassus
Acanthus (Egypt), an ancient Egyptian city
Akanthos (Greece), an ancient Macedonian city
Acantha, County Offaly, a townland in the civil parish of Durrow, barony of Ballycowan, Ireland

Other uses
Acanthus (ornament), a form in architecture and in leather carving, from the plant
Acanthus path, a fictional tradition of enchanters, magicians and witches in the game Mage: The Awakening

See also
List of commonly used taxonomic affixes